Bulimulus hirsutus is a species of gastropod in the Orthalicidae family. It is endemic to Ecuador.  Its natural habitat is subtropical or tropical dry shrubland. It is threatened by habitat loss.

References

Sources

Bulimulus
Endemic gastropods of the Galápagos Islands
Gastropods described in 1977
Taxonomy articles created by Polbot